Night Head 2041 (stylized as NIGHT HEAD 2041) is a Japanese anime television series based on the 1992 Japanese television drama series Night Head. The series is animated by Shirogumi, directed by Takamitsu Hirakawa and written by George Iida, the director of the original drama. Original character designs are provided by Oh! great, while Kenichiro Tomiyasu is drawing the concept art. Yutaka Yamada is composing the series' music, and Slow Curve is credited for planning and production. It aired on Fuji TV's +Ultra programming block from July to September 2021.  Who-ya Extended performed the series' opening theme song "Icy Ivy", while Myuk performed the series' ending theme song "Shion". Crunchyroll licensed the series.

A manga adaptation with art by Akira Ogawa has been serialized online via Kodansha's YanMaga Web website since April 28, 2021 and has been collected in two tankōbon volumes. A novel adaptation written by George Iida in collaboration with Kawato Azusa was released in two volumes between August and September 2021. A stage play adaptation has also been announced.

Characters

Episode list

Notes

References

External links
Anime official website 

+Ultra
2021 anime television series debuts
2021 Japanese novels
Crunchyroll anime
Fuji TV original programming
Japanese webcomics
Kodansha manga
Science fiction anime and manga
Seinen manga
Shirogumi
Supernatural anime and manga
Suspense anime and manga
Television series based on adaptations